Koen de Kort (born 8 September 1982) is a Dutch former professional cyclist, who last rode for UCI WorldTeam .

Biography 
He was born in Gouda and grew up in Liempde. From 2002 to 2004, he was in the  development team of the  cycling team. De Kort had a promising amateur career with wins in the Under 23 version of Paris–Roubaix. In 2005 he became professional with the ProTour team  of Manolo Saiz. That year he won a stage in the 2005 Tour de l'Avenir. In 2007 De Kort joined the  team. Following the positive tests for heterologous blood doping by team members Alexander Vinokourov and Andrey Kashechkin, Astana did not have much chance to compete in 2007 and was limited in 2008. Speaking to Dutch media, De Kort expressed his frustrations at not having the chance to compete after being in a similar situation in 2006 with the Liberty Seguros team. He left Astana at the end of the 2008 season, and joined the  team.

From 2013 to 2016, de Kort was a vital member of the  squad, representing the team at seven Grand Tours and 12 Classics.

In 2017, de Kort joined , and was named in the startlist for the Tour de France.

In June 2021, three of the fingers on his right hand were amputated following an accident while driving a vehicle off-road.

Major results

2004
 1st  Overall Ronde van Vlaams-Brabant
1st Stage 1
 1st Paris–Roubaix Espoirs
 1st Grand Prix Eddy Merckx
 2nd Under–23 race, National Cyclo-cross Championships
 3rd Overall Paris–Corrèze
2005
 1st Stage 4 Tour de l'Avenir
2008
 3rd Time trial, National Road Championships
 4th Overall Ster Elektrotoer
 2009
 1st Suzuka Road Race in Japan
2010
 9th Overall Tour of Britain
2012
 3rd Dwars door Vlaanderen
 7th Overall Ster ZLM Toer
2018
 9th Japan Cup

Grand Tour general classification results timeline

References

External links 

Living people
1982 births
Dutch male cyclists
Sportspeople from Gouda, South Holland
UCI Road World Championships cyclists for the Netherlands
Cyclists from South Holland
20th-century Dutch people
21st-century Dutch people